Vincent Millot was the defending champion but decided not to participate.
Jérémy Chardy won the title after defeating Adrián Menéndez 6–4, 6–3 in the final.

Seeds

Draw

Finals

Top half

Bottom half

References
Main Draw
Qualifying Draw

Internationaux de Nouvelle-Caledonie - Singles
2012 Singles